The 2nd ARY Film Awards or AFA'16 ceremony, presented by the ARY Digital Network and Entertainment Channel, sponsored by Tang and L'Oréal, honored the best Pakistani films of 2015 and took place on April 16, 2016, at the Madinat Jumeirah, in Dubai, UAE, beginning at 7:30 UAE Standard Time. The ceremony was held recorded and televised on May 7, 2016. During the ceremony, the ARY Digital Network and Entertainment Channel presented ARY Film Awards (commonly referred to as AFAs) in 28 categories. The ceremony was televised in the Pakistan by ARY Digital, and produced by Salma Iqbal and Jarjees Seja.

Actor Fahad Mustafa was announced to host the show, along with co-hosts Ahmad Ali Butt, Yasir Hussain and Sana Bucha. Mustafa previously co-hosted the first ceremony in 2014. Having been originally scheduled for February 18, it was rescheduled for March 10, before changing once again to April 16, 2016, due to severe-weather conditions in UAE.

Jawani Phir Nahi Ani won eighteen awards, the most for the evening, winning all big-five awards including Best Actor for Humayun Saeed, Best Actress for Sohai Ali Abro, Best Screenplay for Vasay Chaudhry, Best Director for Nadeem Baig and Best Film. Other winners includes Moor with four awards, Manto with two awards, and Halla Gulla and Wrong No. with one each.

Winners and nominees
The following twelve categories in Viewers choice nominations were announced and set open for voting on February 7, 2016, originally till February 15 but with the extension of ceremony date voting lines were also extend till March 4, at ceremony official website and Facebook page that also includes the nominees from all production banners and companies across the Pakistan.

Awards
Winners are listed first and indicated with a double-dagger.

Honorary ARY Film Awards

The ARY presented following annual Special Awards during the ceremony:

 Lifetime Achievement Award
 Javed Sheikh

 International Icon Award
 Fawad Khan

 Special award for contributing Pakistani Cinema 
 Waheed Murad

Films with multiple nominations and awards

See also
 15th Lux Style Awards 
 4th Hum Awards

References

External links
 Official websites
 

ARY
ARY
2nd
2nd